Georg Gerson Iggers (December 7, 1926 – November 26, 2017) was an American historian of modern Europe, historiography, and European intellectual history. 

Iggers was born in Hamburg, Germany, in 1926. Being a German Jew he fled Germany with his family to the US in 1938, only few weeks before the Kristallnacht. Iggers belonged to the young émigrés from the Third Reich who later in life, as academic scholars in the United States, had a decisive impact on reviewing critically the history of Germany.

In 1957, Iggers became the first White brother initiated into Phi Beta Sigma, Inc, a historically Black fraternity.

He was visiting professor at the Technische Universität Darmstadt in 1991. He was Distinguished Professor Emeritus at University of Buffalo and 2007 recipient of the First Class Cross of the Order of Merit of the Federal Republic of Germany. Iggers received the Humboldt Prize, honorary doctorate degrees from the University of Richmond, Technische Universität Darmstadt, and Philander Smith College, and fellowships from the American Philosophical Society, Fulbright Foundation, Guggenheim Foundation, National Endowment for the Humanities, and Rockefeller Foundation.

He was especially noted for his writings on historiography. 

He died on November 26, 2017, of complications from a cerebral hemorrhage.

Writings  
Autobiography
 Georg G. Iggers, Wilma A. Iggers: Zwei Seiten der Geschichte. Lebensbericht aus unruhigen Zeiten. Vandenhoeck & Ruprecht, Göttingen 2002, .
 Two Lives in Uncertain Times. Facing the Challenges of the 20th Century as Scholars and Citizens. Berghahn, New York/ Oxford 2006, .
 Georg G. Iggers: "History and Social Action beyond National and Continental Borders." In: Andreas W. Daum, Hartmut Lehmann, James J. Sheehan: The Second Generation. Émigrés from Nazi Germany as Historians. With a biobibliographical guide. Berghahn, New York 2016, 82–96.

Monographies
 The Cult of Authority. The Political Philosophy of the Saint-Simonians. A Chapter in the Intellectual History of Totalitarianism. Martinus Nijhoff, The Hague 1958.
 The German Conception of History. The National Tradition of Historical Thought from Herder to the Present. Wesleyan University Press, Middletown, Connecticut 1968.
 (German translation: Deutsche Geschichtswissenschaft. Eine Kritik der traditionellen Geschichtsauffassung von Herder bis zur Gegenwart. dtv 1971) 
 New Directions in European Historiography. With a contribution by Norman Baker. Wesleyan University Press, Middletown, Connecticut 1975.
 German: Neue Geschichtswissenschaft. Vom Historismus zur historischen Sozialwissenschaft. Ein internationaler Vergleich. dtv 1978.
 Marxismus und Geschichtswissenschaft heute. Becker, Velten 1996, .
 Geschichtswissenschaft im 20. Jahrhundert. Ein kritischer Überblick im internationalen Zusammenhang. Mit einem Nachwort. Vandenhoeck & Ruprecht 1993, ; 2nd ed. 1996.
 Historiography in the twentieth century. From scientific objectivity to the postmodern challenge. Wesleyan University Press, Hanover, NH 1997, .
 Geschichtswissenschaft im 20. Jahrhundert. Ein kritischer Überblick im internationalen Zusammenhang. Neuausgabe, Vandenhoeck & Ruprecht 2007, .
with Q. Edward Wang and Supriya Mukherjee: A Global History of Modern Historiography. Routledge 2008 (2nd ed. 2017), .

See also
Authoritarianism

References

External links 
 Andreas W. Daum, "Iggers, Georg Gerson." Deutsche Biographie 
 
 Oral History project Zwei Seiten der Geschichte documenting the life work of Georg and Wilma Iggers

1926 births
2017 deaths
Writers from Hamburg
The New School alumni
University at Buffalo faculty
University of Chicago alumni
University of Richmond alumni
20th-century American historians
Historians of Germany
Historiographers
Humboldt Research Award recipients
Intellectual historians
Jewish emigrants from Nazi Germany to the United States
Officers Crosses of the Order of Merit of the Federal Republic of Germany

Academic staff of Technische Universität Darmstadt